Nuna is a series of solar-powered vehicles.

Nuna may also refer to:

Geography
Nuna (supercontinent) or Columbia, one of Earth's oldest supercontinents
Piz Nuna a mountain in the Sesvenna Range of the Alps
Nuna, Poland, a village in Gmina Nasielsk, Nowy Dwór Mazowiecki, Masovian, Poland
Nuna people, one of the Gurunsi peoples who live in southern Burkina Faso

Other
Nuña, a subspecies of common bean Phaseolus vulgaris
"Núna" (Icelandic "Now"), a song, Icelandic entry in the Eurovision Song Contest 1995
Nuna (month), the second month of the Mandaean calendar
Nuna (Star Wars), fictional gamebirds in the Star Wars setting

See also

Nela (name)
Nina (name)